Andrija Mijailović (born 7 June 1995) is a Serbian footballer, who plays as a defender for FK Zemun.

Club career
Mijailović was a member of Red Star Belgrade and Partizan youth categories. He made his first senior appearances during the 2013–14 season, in which he noted Serbian First League 17 caps for Teleoptik. After le left the club, he spent 6 months playing with Srem Jakovo, before he joined Serbian SuperLiga side OFK Beograd at the beginning of 2016. Next he moved to Kolubara, where he spent the first half of the 2016–17 season without official matches. At the beginning of 2017, Mijailović joined Bežanija.

References

External links
 
 
 

1995 births
Living people
Footballers from Belgrade
Association football defenders
Serbian footballers
FK Teleoptik players
FK Srem Jakovo players
OFK Beograd players
FK Kolubara players
FK Bežanija players
FK Radnički Niš players
FK Zemun players
Serbian First League players
Serbian SuperLiga players